William Thaddeus Sexton (September 3, 1901 – June 22, 1983) was a major general of the United States Army who participated in World War II.

Biography
William Thaddeus Sexton was born on September 3, 1901 to James William Sexton and his wife Fannie (Davis) Sexton.

From 1918 until 1919 Sexton attended University of Kansas. From July 1, 1920 until June 12, 1924 Sexton was a cadet at the U.S. Military Academy at West Point and subsequently promoted to second lieutenant of field artillery. His ensuing military education involved Field Artillery School, which he graduated in 1930 with a promotion to first lieutenant of field artillery on October 20, 1929 and Signal School in 1934.

In 1939 Sexton, who had reached the rank of captain in the meantime, published Soldiers in the sun: An adventure in imperialism. The book provides a military history of operations in the Philippines form 1898 to 1902, discussing the Philippine Insurrection based on published official documents, supported by maps and illustrations.

In 1940 Sexton attended Command and General Staff School and was made Assistant Secretary in the Office of the Chief of Staff. Later in the war Sexton became Secretary in the Office of the Chief of Staff from 1943 until 1944.

On September 17, 1945 Sexton who was Brigadier General and commanding general of the 3rd Infantry Division at the time, signed the Wanfried Agreement in his capacity as representative of the American High Command. The treaty enforced boundary changes between the U.S. and Soviet zone of occupation in Germany.

After World War II Sexton married his wife Mary Forester Lewis in 1950.

In 1951 Sexton attended Parachute School, followed by his final promotion to major general in 1955.

He died in San Antonio on June 22, 1983, and was buried at Arlington National Cemetery.

References 
 
 Sexton, William T., Soldiers in the Sun: An Adventure in Imperialism, Military Service Publishing Co., Harrisburg, Pennsylvania, 1939.

External links 
William T. Sexton Papers at the George C. Marshall Foundation
Generals of World War II

1901 births
1983 deaths
Military personnel from Kansas
United States Army generals
Recipients of the Croix de Guerre (France)
Recipients of the Legion of Honour
Recipients of the Legion of Merit
United States Military Academy alumni
United States Army Command and General Staff College alumni
People from Leavenworth, Kansas
Burials at Arlington National Cemetery
United States Army generals of World War II